Socorro County is a county in the U.S. state of New Mexico. As of the 2010 census, the population was 17,866. The county seat is Socorro. The county was formed in 1852 as one of the original nine counties of New Mexico Territory. Socorro was originally the name given to a Native American village (see: Puebloan peoples) by Don Juan de Oñate in 1598. Having received vitally needed food and assistance from the native population, Oñate named the pueblo Socorro ("succor" in English).

Socorro County is home to multiple scientific research institutions including New Mexico Institute of Mining and Technology, the National Radio Astronomy Observatory and its associated Very Large Array, the Magdalena Ridge Observatory, and the Langmuir Laboratory for Atmospheric Research. Federal public lands in Socorro County include parts of the Cibola National Forest, the Bosque del Apache National Wildlife Refuge, the Sevilleta National Wildlife Refuge, the Bureau of Land Management (BLM) Socorro Field Office, parts of the Salinas Pueblo Missions National Monument, and parts of the El Camino Real de Tierra Adentro National Historic Trail.

History
Socorro County's history is intimately linked with the rich history of the surrounding area. Basham noted in his report documenting the archeological history of the Cibola National Forest's Magdalena Ranger District, which is almost entirely within Socorro County, that “[t]he heritage resources on the district are diverse and representative of nearly every prominent human evolutionary event known to anthropology. Evidence for human use of district lands date back 14,000 years to the Paleoindian period providing glimpses into the peopling of the New World and megafaunal extinction.“
Much of the now Magdalena Ranger District were a province of the Apache. Bands of Apache effectively controlled the Magdalena-Datil region from the seventeenth century until they were defeated in the Apache Wars in the late nineteenth century.

Outlaw renegades Butch Cassidy and the Wild Bunch and notorious Apaches like Cochise and Geronimo have ties to Socorro County's San Mateo Mountains. Vicks Peak was named after Victorio, “a Mimbreño Apache leader whose territory included much of the south and southwest New Mexico.” Famous for defying relocation orders in 1879 and leading his warriors “on a two-year reign of terror before he was killed,” Victorio is at least as highly regarded as Geronimo or Cochise among Apaches. Perhaps most famous outlaw was the Apache Kid whose supposed grave lies within the Apache Kid Wilderness. Stories of depredations by the Apache Kid, and of his demise, became so common and dramatic that in southwestern folklore they may be exceeded only by tales of lost Spanish gold. Native Americans lingered in the San Mateos well into the 1900s. We know this by an essay written by Aldo Leopold in 1919 where he documents stumbling upon the remains of a recently abandoned Indian hunting camp.

A mining rush followed the Apache wars – gold, silver, and copper were found in the mountains. It wasn't until this time that extensive use of the area by non-Native Americans occurred. While some mining activity, involving gold, silver, and copper, occurred in the southern part of the range near the end of the nineteenth century, the prospecting/mining remnants are barely visible today due to collapse, topographic screening, and vegetation regrowth. While miners combed the mountains for mineral riches during the late nineteenth and early twentieth centuries, stockmen drove tens of thousands of sheep and cattle to stockyards at the village of Magdalena, then linked by rail with Socorro. In fact, the last regularly used cattle trail in the United States stretched 125 miles westward from Magdalena. The route was formally known as the Magdalena Livestock Driveway, but more popularly known to cowboys and cattlemen as the Beefsteak Trail. The trail began use in 1865 and its peak was in 1919. The trail was used continually until trailing gave way to trucking and the trail officially closed in 1971.

Geography
It is the second-largest county in New Mexico by area, after Catron County.

The southern portion of the Rocky Mountains extend into New Mexico and Socorro County. There are several mountain ranges that spread throughout the county. The Forest Service manages portions of four mountain ranges: the Bear, Datil, Magdalena, and San Mateo Mountains. Most of the land that comprises these mountains are within the Cibola National Forest. These ranges, as well as Ladron Peak located in Socorro County, are classified as sky islands.

Adjacent counties
 Cibola County – northwest
 Valencia County – north
 Torrance County – northeast
 Lincoln County – east
 Sierra County – south
 Catron County – west

National protected areas
 Bosque del Apache National Wildlife Refuge
 Sevilleta National Wildlife Refuge
 Cibola National Forest (part)
 National System of Public Lands managed by the BLM’s Socorro Field Office (part)
 El Camino Real de Tierra Adentro National Historic Trail (part)
 Salinas Pueblo Missions National Monument (part)

Demographics

2000 census
As of the 2000 census, there were 18,078 people, 6,675 households, and 4,492 families residing in the county. The population density was 3 people per square mile (1/km2). There were 7,808 housing units at an average density of 1 per square mile (0/km2). The racial makeup of the county was 62.9% White, 0.6% Black or African American, 10.9% Native American, 1.1% Asian, 0.1% Pacific Islander, 20.1% from other races, and 4.3% from two or more races. 48.7% of the population were Hispanic or Latino of any race.

There were 6,675 households, out of which 33.8% had children under the age of 18 living with them, 48.4% were married couples living together, 13.3% had a female householder with no husband present, and 32.7% were non-families. 26.8% of all households were made up of individuals, and 8.2% had someone living alone who was 65 years of age or older. The average household size was 2.62 and the average family size was 3.20.

In the county, the population was spread out, with 28.4% under the age of 18, 12.6% from 18 to 24, 26.1% from 25 to 44, 22.0% from 45 to 64, and 10.9% who were 65 years of age or older. The median age was 32 years. For every 100 females there were 103.3 males. For every 100 females age 18 and over, there were 103.9 males.

The median income for a household in the county was $23,439, and the median income for a family was $29,544. Males had a median income of $28,490 versus $22,482 for females. The per capita income for the county was $12,826. About 24.1% of families and 31.7% of the population were below the poverty line, including 43.6% of those under age 18 and 24.3% of those age 65 or over.

2010 census
As of the 2010 census, there were 17,866 people, 7,014 households, and 4,349 families residing in the county. The racial makeup of the county was 75.1% white, 11.7% American Indian, 1.2% Asian, 1.1% black or African American, 8.1% from other races, and 2.8% from two or more races. Those of Hispanic or Latino origin made up 48.5% of the population. In terms of ancestry, 7.1% were English, 6.8% were German, and 4.2% were American.

Of the 7,014 households, 30.4% had children under the age of 18 living with them, 43.1% were married couples living together, 12.9% had a female householder with no husband present, 38.% were non-families, and 30.8% of all households were made up of individuals. The average household size was 2.46 and the average family size was 3.09. The median age was 36.9 years.

The median income for a household in the county was $33,284 and the median income for a family was $41,964. Males had a median income of $40,295 versus $27,819 for females. The per capita income for the county was $17,801. About 22.7% of families and 26.8% of the population were below the poverty line, including 33.1% of those under age 18 and 19.0% of those age 65 or over.

Politics
The majority (51 percent) of voters registered in the 2012 General Election were Democrats, with the rest of registered voters breaking down as 30 percent Republican, 15 percent Declined To Say, and 3 percent Other. In 2012, Socorro County voted for President Obama 56 percent to 38 percent, with a trend of voting Democratic in the previous five presidential elections.

Socorro County voted for Senator Heinrich (D) 53 percent to 43 percent in 2012. While Rep. Pearce (R) won Socorro County 52 percent to 48 percent in 2012, Socorro supported Democrats for the U.S. House in both 2008 and 2010 (with 50.2% and 63% Democratic, respectively). The County supported Governor Martinez (R) 53 percent to 47 percent in 2010 but went for Governor Richardson (D) in both 2002 and 2006. Socorro has supported Democratic state senators in Districts 28 and 30 for every election since 2000. In contrast, the county has supported a Republican state representative in District 49 since 2000.
The current county commissioners of Socorro County are:
 Pauline Jaramillo, R-Dist. 1, Chair
 Martha Salas, R-Dist. 2, Vice Chair
 Manuel Anaya, D-Dist. 3
 Danny Monette, R-Dist. 4,
 Juan Gutierrez, R-Dist. 5
Ravi Bhasker has been serving as the mayor of Socorro since 1990 and is a general practice medical doctor. The current mayor of Magdalena is Richard Rumpf (ZW), elected by the village board upon the previous mayor's resignation in 2016.

Ecology, recreation and tourism

With multiple mountain ranges, extents of grasslands and marshes providing a wide array of available habitats, Socorro County is home to an extensive variety of ecosystems and wildlife. Socorro County contains 826 species of wildlife, including 14 amphibians, 60 reptiles, 336 birds, and 96 mammals. Wildlife in the County includes coyote, deer, elk, pronghorn antelope, bighorn sheep, Barbary sheep, black bear, mountain lion, wild turkey, various furbearers, Mexican spotted owl, and quail.

There are three congressionally designated Wilderness areas located within Socorro County. The Apache Kid and the Withington Wilderness Areas are both located in the San Mateo Mountains within the Cibola National Forest's Magdalena Ranger District. The Bosque del Apache Wilderness comprises two separate sections, totaling 30,427 acres of the National Wildlife Refuge. There are an additional 172,143 acres of Forest Service Inventoried Roadless Areas and 159,891 acres of BLM Wilderness Study Areas in the county. These undeveloped lands without roads offer outstanding opportunities to experience the area's amazing natural heritage, to getaway and enjoy the outdoors and, for the hearty, to explore deep into the backcountry and challenge yourself in the area's big wild.

The high mountains, remote canyons, pristine forests and diverse wildlife found on the area's national forests, national wildlife refuges, national monuments, and BLM's national system of public lands provide for phenomenal recreation opportunities, including picnicking, hiking, backpacking, wildlife viewing, horseback-riding, and hunting. In fact, the four biggest elk in New Mexico were bagged in Socorro county and the Datil Mountains. The two most popular recreational activities on the Cibola National Forest are hiking/walking and viewing natural features with 35% and 15% of visitors citing these as their main activities, respectively. The Bosque del Apache National Wildlife Refuge hosts the Festival of the Cranes every November, celebrating the arrival of sandhill cranes and other migratory birds. Rare whooping cranes are also found occasionally on the Bosque del Apache.

The natural amenities in Socorro contribute to a strong tourism industry for the county. Visitors spent $47.4 million in Socorro County in 2011. Recreation alone accounted for more than $4 million in visitor spending in both 2010 and 2011. Tourism accounts for 8.8% of employment and 4.5% of labor income for the county. Additionally, tourism resulted in $7.7 million of total tax revenue, including $1.1 million in local tax revenue.

Communities

City
 Socorro (county seat)

Village
 Magdalena

Census-designated places

 Abeytas
 Alamillo
 Alamo
 Chamizal
 Escondida
 La Joya
 Las Nutrias
 Lemitar
 Luis Lopez
 Polvadera
 San Acacia
 San Antonio
 San Antonito
 Veguita

Unincorporated communities

 Bernardo
 Claunch

Populated Places

 Bingham
 Sabinal

Ghost towns

 Adobe
 Alamillo Pueblo
 Bosquecito
 Canta Recio
 Carthage
 Contadero
 Council Rock
 Field
 Kelly
 Pueblito de la Parida
 Paraje
 Park City
 Pilabó
 Qualacu
 Riley
 Rosedale
 San Felipe
 San Marcial
 San Pascual Pueblo
 San Pedro
 Senecú
 Tajo
 Tokay
 Val Verde

Education
School districts include:
 Belen Consolidated Schools
 Carrizozo Municipal Schools
 Corona Municipal Schools
 Magdalena Municipal Schools
 Mountainair Public Schools
 Socorro Consolidated Schools

See also
 National Register of Historic Places listings in Socorro County, New Mexico
 New Mexico Institute of Mining and Technology
 Trinity Site, the first test of an atomic bomb
 Very Large Array
 Cibola National Forest
 Bureau of Land Management
 Bosque del Apache National Wildlife Refuge
 Magdalena Ridge Observatory
 Langmuir Laboratory for Atmospheric Research
 Box Recreation Area

References

Further reading
 Interior Secretary Formally Designates BLM Lands the National System of Public Lands
 The Mountains of New Mexico by Robert Julyan, 
 New Mexico's Wilderness Areas: The Complete Guide by Robert Julyan, 
 Bosque del Apache National Wildlife Refuge: 48 Hours of Flight by Jim Jamieson, 
 Bosque Del Apache National Wildlife Refuge- A Photographer's and Visitor's Guide by Ralph H. Wetmore II, 
 Finding Refuge: A Safe Place to Land  by Sandy Seth, Valerie Graves, Laurel Seth, ASIN: B000S9LU5W. "The Bosque del Apache National Wildlife Refuge seen through the hearts of an artist, a photographer, and a birder."
 Geologic Map of the Becker SW And Cerro Montoso Quadrangles, Socorro County, New Mexico, by Donald A. Myers, Joseph A. Sharps, and E.J. McKay. Reston, Va.: U.S. Department of the Interior, U.S. Geological Survey, 1986.
 Socorro County, New Mexico: Including its History, The Fort Craig, The Very Large Array, The Salinas Pueblo Missions National Monument, and More by Johnathan Black, 
 The Socorro Country Fat Tire Trail Book, The Socorro Fat Tire Committee in association with the Socorro County Chamber of Commerce, Socorro County Chamber of Commerce, Socorros, New Mexico, 1993, stapled paperback pamphlet,  see mountain bicycling.

External links
 Socorro News
 Chamber of Commerce
 Mountain Mail newspaper 
 El Defensor Chieftain newspaper
 Socorro County InfoNet
 wilderness.net
  Historical Society of New Mexico
 Magdalena Ranger District - Cibola National Forest
 New Mexico Game and Fish
 US Fish & Wildlife Service
 Bureau of Land Management

 
1852 establishments in New Mexico Territory
Populated places established in 1852